Başmakçı is a village in Niğde Province, Turkey.

References

See also

Villages in Niğde Province